Øksendal is a Norwegian surname. Notable people with the surname include:

Asbjørn Øksendal (1922–2015), Norwegian novelist and non-fiction writer
Bernt Øksendal (born 1945), Norwegian mathematician

Norwegian-language surnames